Shushensky District is an administrative and municipal district (raion), one of the forty-three in Krasnoyarsk Krai, Russia. It is located in the south of the krai and borders with Minusinsky District in the north, Karatuzsky District in the northeast, Yermakovsky District in the east and southeast, the Tuva Republic in the southwest, and with the Republic of Khakassia in the west. Its administrative center is the urban locality (an urban-type settlement) of Shushenskoye. Population:  36,891 (2002 Census);  The population of Shushenskoye accounts for 52.7% of the district's total population.

History
The district was founded on January 5, 1944.

Government
As of 2013, the Head of the district and the Chairman of the District Council is Anatoly G. Kerzik.

References

Notes

Sources

Districts of Krasnoyarsk Krai
States and territories established in 1944